Seán Barrett (born 9 August 1944) is a former Irish Fine Gael politician who served as Ceann Comhairle of Dáil Éireann from 2011 to 2016, Minister for Defence and Minister for the Marine from 1995 to 1997, Government Chief Whip from 1982 to 1986 and 1994 to 1995. He served as a Teachta Dála (TD) for the Dún Laoghaire constituency from 1981 to 2002 and 2007 to 2020.

Early life
He was educated at CBS Dún Laoghaire, C.B.C. Monkstown and Presentation Brothers College in Glasthule, County Dublin. Before Barrett entered politics he was a partner in a successful Dublin-based insurance brokerage firm (Barrett, Hegarty Moloney, established in 1980). A keen fan of horse-racing, in 1987, he also established Seán Barrett Bloodstock Insurances Ltd.

Political career
At the 1977 general election, Barrett stood as a Fine Gael candidate in the Dublin County South, but failed to win a seat. He was first elected to Dáil Éireann when he stood in the Dún Laoghaire constituency at the 1981 general election, where he was returned at each subsequent election until his retirement at the 2002 general election. He came out of retirement to successfully contest the 2007 general election.

In 1999, he announced that he would not contest the next election, saying "at this stage, I believe it is time to make way for the next generation who must be given the chance to make their own contribution."

When Barrett, Liam T. Cosgrave and Monica Barnes were each first elected in 1981, Fine Gael secured three of the five seats and 48% of the first preference vote in Dún Laoghaire. But this massive vote waned over the following years and when Barrett and Barnes retired at the 2002 general election, Fine Gael failed to win even one seat in Dún Laoghaire.

Return to politics
In February 2006, Barrett announced that he wanted to come back from retirement, and stand again as a Fine Gael candidate at the next general election. He insisted that he would stand only if selected by the local party members, and would not accept being imposed as a candidate by Fine Gael headquarters.

At a selection meeting in Dalkey in May 2006, Barrett and barrister Eugene Regan were chosen as Fine Gael's two candidates in the Dún Laoghaire constituency. With return of Barrett, the party was confident of winning two of the five seats, but at the general election in May 2007, Barrett was the fourth candidate returned to the 30th Dáil and Regan was not elected.

Barrett did not return immediately to Fine Gael's front bench, but became Chairperson of the Oireachtas Joint Committee on Climate Change and Energy Security. He was subsequently promoted back to the front bench as Spokesperson on Foreign Affairs following an attempted heave against Enda Kenny.

He met Chinese President Xi Jinping in 2013.

Mahon Tribunal
In evidence to the Mahon Tribunal on 8 June 2006,

A report in The Irish Times in July 2006 said that a representative of Fine Gael had described the Tribunal "as an outrage and a disgrace" for allowing unfounded allegations to be made against Barrett. Fine Gael, through its solicitor, expressed regret to the Tribunal on 25 July for this remark, describing it as 'inappropriate'.

References

External links
 Seán Barrett's page on the Fine Gael website
 Oireachtas Joint Committee on Climate Change and Energy Security

 

1944 births
councillors of Dublin County Council
Fine Gael TDs
Government Chief Whip (Ireland)
living people
local councillors in Dún Laoghaire–Rathdown
members of the 22nd Dáil
members of the 23rd Dáil
members of the 24th Dáil
members of the 25th Dáil
members of the 26th Dáil
members of the 27th Dáil
members of the 28th Dáil
members of the 30th Dáil
members of the 31st Dáil
members of the 32nd Dáil
Ministers for Defence (Ireland)
Ministers of State of the 24th Dáil
Ministers of State of the 27th Dáil
people educated at C.B.C. Monkstown
people from Dún Laoghaire
presiding officers of Dáil Éireann